Conny Karlsson (born 30 December 1975 in Dragsfjärd, Finland) is a 195-cm tall former Finnish shot putter, who competed for Pargas IF. His personal best in the men's shot put currently stands at 20.78 m, which he put on 4 August 2001 in the World Championships in Edmonton, Canada. He was coached by Robert Malmberg.

Karlsson has six medals from the Finnish Championships, three of which are gold. In 2006, he placed second in the Finnish Championships, but was later on awarded the gold medal when the winner, Ville Tiisanoja, was caught doping and stripped of his gold medal.
 
Karlsson was the 18th member to be inducted into the 20 meter club after he successfully putted the shot 20.45 m in a competition on 31 May 2001 in Espoo, Finland. He  had to end his career early 2007 due to colitis ulcerosa.

Achievements

External links
 
 Conny Karlsson's own website

1975 births
Living people
Swedish-speaking Finns
People from Kimitoön
Finnish male shot putters
Sportspeople from Southwest Finland